West Cedar is a ghost town in Phillips County, Kansas, United States.

History
West Cedar was issued a post office in 1874. The post office was discontinued in 1888.

References

Former populated places in Phillips County, Kansas
Former populated places in Kansas